Extreme Ghost Stories is a British supernatural documentary television series produced by ITV Granada, consisting of four one hour episodes.

Origin and notes
In 2005, ITV Granada appealed for those whose lives had been affected by ghostly experiences to contact the station regarding production of a paranormal series. The series was broadcast by ITV in 2006, and was later shown on American cable channel WE tv in September 2007. The series features drama reconstructions of ghostly encounters of some well-known haunted locations as well as individual cases not known to paranormal enthusiasts. It is narrated by Rob Brown.

A recurring supernatural entity in the series is the black mass, a dark form with a vaguely humanoid stance, which witnesses feel represents evil.

The series features contributions from resident Most Haunted Live! historian and Most Haunted: Midsummer Murders presenter Lesley Smith, writers Clive Hopwood and Jan-Andrew Henderson, and late Angel Radio DJ Ed Paine.

Episodes

See also
 List of ghost films

References

External links

2006 British television series debuts
2006 British television series endings
British supernatural television shows
ITV documentaries
Paranormal television
British ghosts
Television series about ghosts
Television series by ITV Studios
Television shows produced by Granada Television
English-language television shows